The 5th Luftwaffe Field Division was an infantry division of the Luftwaffe branch of the Wehrmacht that fought in World War II. It was formed using surplus Luftwaffe ground crew and served on the Eastern Front from late 1942 to mid 1944, when was disbanded.

Operational history

The 5th Luftwaffe Field Division was one of several Luftwaffe divisions formed in 1942 from surplus ground crew and intended to serve as conventional infantry divisions. The 5th was raised in October 1942, under the command of Generalmajor Hans-Joachim von Armin.

The division comprised four battalions of infantry, a battalion of field artillery, a company of assault guns and engineer, signal and supply units. It was sent to the southern sector of the Eastern Front, where it served in the Caucasus. It soon withdrew in the face of the Soviet advance and was engaged in the fighting around the Kuban bridgehead from February to April 1943. It was evacuated to the Crimea the following month.

In September 1943, the division was shifted north to Melitopol, on the Panther–Wotan line. During the Soviet Battle of the Dnieper, it suffered many casualties. Responsibility for the remnants of the division was transferred to the Heer (Army) on 1 November 1943, and it was renamed 5th Field Division (L). It was transferred to Romania for restructuring and refitting. Its infantry strength was reduced to two battalions, and it also received the staff of the 9th and 10th Jager Regiments (L). It was returned to the Eastern Front and attached to the Third Romanian Army. It fought in the Odessa Offensive until May 1944, when the division was disbanded. Its personnel were distributed among the 76th, 320th and 335th infantry divisions.

Commanders
 Generalmajor Hans-Joachim von Armin (October–November 1942);
 Oberst Hans-Bruno Schulz-Heym (December 1942 – November 1943);
 Generalmajor Both von Huelsen (March–June 1944).

Notes
Footnotes

Citations

References

 
 

05
1942 establishments in Germany
1944 disestablishments in Germany
Military units and formations established in 1942
Military units and formations disestablished in 1944